Lincoln Theological College was a theological college in Lincoln, United Kingdom.

History
Founded by Edward White Benson, when he was Chancellor of Lincoln Cathedral, the college opened on 25 January 1874. It was also known as Scholae Cancellarii. The building it occupied on Drury Lane, which was originally the county infirmary, closed in 1995 after having its permit as a college recognised for ordination training withdrawn by the Church of England owing to reduced numbers of residential ordination candidates nationally, with an increasing number training on part-time non-residential courses. The college had wanted to remain open, developing itself as a research institution, possibly affiliated to a nearby university. The buildings are now owned by the Lincoln Theological Institute for the Study of Religion and Society (a registered charity), based at the University of Manchester, established in 1997 by Martyn Percy.

Once Lincoln Theological College had closed, the only Anglican theological college in the East Midlands offering training for those entering stipendiary ministry was St John's College, Nottingham, in Bramcote.

Curriculum
At the time of closure the Scholae Cancellarii offered training leading to externally validated and conferred BTh and MA degrees.

Affiliations
Lincoln Theological College worked closely with the then-named Bishop Grossteste College, which at the time was a Church of England teacher training college, and shared courses. It also worked with the University of Nottingham, which validated the BEd degrees of BGC.

In 2009 a School of Theology and Ministry Studies was formed following the signing, in Lincoln Cathedral, of an agreement between the University of Lincoln, Bishop Grosseteste University College, the Diocese of Lincoln and Lincoln Cathedral on 14 November 2009.

Current situation

The college's former building on Drury Lane was renamed Chad Varah House, in honour of the Samaritans' founder, who was educated at the college and served his title in Lincoln. The building itself is a Grade II Listed building. The original County Hospital was built 1776–77, designed by John Carr of York and William Lumby. The Chapel was added in 1906, by architect Temple Moore. At some point in the late 19th century a large house and water tower were added, and in 1962 the building was extended at the rear.

Notable alumni

 Hugh Edward Ashdown
 Henry R.T. Brandreth
 Antony Bridge
 Edwin Boston
 Richard Chartres – former Bishop of London
 John Dudley Davies
 Patrick Evans
 John Frewer
 John Gibbs (bishop)
 John Green - Royal Navy chaplain & Chaplain of the Fleet
 John Grindrod
 Lemprière Durell Hammond
 Alfred Jowett
 Charles John Klyberg
 John Moses (dean)
 Edward Norman
 Michael John Nott
 Regin Prenter
 Gerald Sharp
 John Shone
 Ulrich Ernst Simon
 Mark Strange – current Bishop of Moray, Ross and Caithness and Primus of the Scottish Episcopal Church
 Richard Henry McPhail Third
 Kenneth George Thompson
 Mark Tully – later BBC correspondent
 Chad Varah – founder of Samaritans
 Jeremy Walsh (Bishop)
 Ambrose Walter Marcus Weekes
 Alan Peter Winton – current Bishop of Thetford
 John Yates (bishop)

Notable staff

Former Sub-Wardens
 Michael Ramsey from 1930–6 – later Archbishop of Canterbury from 1961–74
 Eric Lionel Mascall from 1937–45
 Basil Stanley Moss from 1946–51
 Thomas George Adames Baker from 1954–60
 David Lunn from 1966–70 - later Bishop of Sheffield

Former Wardens
 Walter Julius Carey from 1919–21
 Eric Symes Abbott from 1936–45
 Cyril Kenneth Sansbury from 1945–52
 Oliver Stratford Tomkins from 1953–9
 Alan Brunskill Webster from 1959–70
 Andrew Graham from 1970–77
 Bill Jacob from 1985-96

References

External links
 Lincoln Theological Institute – based in Manchester

Anglican seminaries and theological colleges
Former theological colleges in England
Educational institutions established in 1874
Educational institutions disestablished in 1995
University of Lincoln
1874 establishments in England
1995 disestablishments in England
Bible colleges, seminaries and theological colleges in England
Alumni of Lincoln Theological College
Lincoln Theological College